The Teruel multiple rocket launcher was in service with the Spanish Army between 1985 and 2011. This system is capable of launching 140mm artillery rockets from 40 launch tubes in less than 30 seconds. It is mounted on a Pegaso truck.

Before firing, stabilizing jacks must be lowered and the blast shield raised to protect the cab and its occupants. Rockets can be fired out to a range of 25 kilometres.

Operators

Current operators
 :  8

Former operators
 : 14

See also 

 RM-70
 Katyusha, BM-13, BM-8, and BM-31 multiple rocket launchers of World War II
 BM-14 140mm multiple rocket launcher
 BM-21 122mm multiple rocket launcher
 List of armoured fighting vehicles by country

References

Wheeled self-propelled rocket launchers
Military vehicles of Spain
Multiple rocket launchers